Hox or HOX may refer to:
 Hox gene
 Hoxton railway station, in London
 Joop Hox (born 1949), Dutch psychologist
 House of X and Powers of X